Candidates representing the Conservative Party took part in the 2011 Canadian federal election. 166 of them won their seat, giving the party an overall majority in the House of Commons.

Newfoundland and Labrador - 7 seats

Prince Edward Island - 4 seats

Nova Scotia - 11 seats

New Brunswick - 10 seats

Quebec - 75 seats

Ontario - 106 seats

Manitoba - 14 Seats

Saskatchewan - 14 seats

Alberta - 28 seats

British Columbia - 36 seats

Yukon - 1 seat

Northwest Territories - 1 seat

Nunavut - 1 seat

See also
Results of the Canadian federal election, 2008
Results by riding for the Canadian federal election, 2008

References

External links
 Conservative Party of Canada website
 Elections Canada – List of Confirmed Candidates for the 41st General Election

2011